Soon Yu (born August 5, 1965) is a Taiwanese-American speaker, writer and former adjunct professor at The New School's Parsons School of Design. Yu is the founder of Gazoontite and the author of the book Iconic Advantage and Friction.

Early life 
Yu was born in Taiwan and moved to Davis, California, at age 3, where his father was an agricultural geneticist. Soon received his BS in Electrical Engineering from the University of California, Davis in 1988 and his MBA from Stanford University in 1993.

Career 

Soon served as the global VP of innovation and as a corporate officer for VF Corporation from 2010 to 2016. Prior to working at VF Corporation, he has also worked at The Clorox Company He left his management position at Clorox to pursue a sales associate position at Crate & Barrel, taking an 85% pay cut and earning $5/hour to gain retail experience. He has also held positions as an engineer with Advanced Micro Devices, an associate consultant with Bain & Company, general manager at Chiquita Brands International, and chief marketing officer at SafeWeb.

In 1998, Yu founded Gazoontite, a retailer of allergy and asthma related products. It was one of the first retail/eCommerce companies to promote and build its business model around the multi-channel shopping environment. Two years after its launch, The Wall Street Journal identified Gazoontite as the “poster child of Web-era excess and stupidity”, however, in the process Yu set the tone for what is now referred to as omni-channel retailing.

His book, Iconic Advantage, won the 2019 Axiom Business Book Award in Advertising / Marketing / PR / Event Planning.

Writings 
Books

 Soon Yu, Dave Birss (May 24, 2022). Friction: Adding Value By Making People Work for It. ZenKarma Media. ISBN 979-8985967210
 Soon Yu, Dave Birss (February 6, 2018). Iconic Advantage: Don't chase the new, innovate the old. Savio Republic.

References 

American motivational speakers
American writers
1965 births
Living people
University of California, Davis alumni
American people of Taiwanese descent